Oscar Laud (born 1 May 1976) is a Ghanaian former professional footballer who played as a forward. He played in four matches for the Ghana national team in 1994 and 1995, scoring one goal. He was also named in Ghana's squad for the 1994 African Cup of Nations tournament, without playing.

After a short spell in Egypt, Laud moved to Germany in 1998. He got one season in the Regionalliga, but later played on lower tiers from the fourth to the eleventh.

References

External links
 

1976 births
Living people
Ghanaian footballers
Association football forwards
Ghana international footballers
1994 African Cup of Nations players
Ghana Premier League players
Egyptian Premier League players
Regionalliga players
Dawu Youngstars players
Zamalek SC players
Kickers Emden players
SV 19 Straelen players
Ghanaian expatriate footballers
Expatriate footballers in Egypt
Ghanaian expatriate sportspeople in Egypt
Expatriate footballers in Germany
Ghanaian expatriate sportspeople in Germany
Ghana Premier League top scorers